Otsego Township may refer to the following places in the United States:

 Otsego Township, Steuben County, Indiana
 Otsego Township, Michigan

See also 
 Otsego (disambiguation)
 Otsego Lake Township, Michigan

Township name disambiguation pages